The 1928 Chattanooga Moccasins football team represented the University of Chattanooga as a member of the Southern Intercollegiate Athletic Association (SIAA) during the 1928 college football season. The team won the SIAA championship.

Schedule

References

Chattanooga
Chattanooga Mocs football seasons
Chattanooga Moccasins football